David Hilberry Berger (born December 21, 1959) is a United States Marine Corps four-star general currently serving as the 38th Commandant of the United States Marine Corps.

Since his commissioning in 1981, he has served in a variety of command and staff billets, including his participation in Operation Iraqi Freedom and Operation Enduring Freedom.

Early life and education
Berger is a native of Woodbine, Maryland. He graduated from Glenelg High School in 1977. 

Berger holds a BSc in engineering from Tulane University, and two Master's degrees, one in International Public Policy from Johns Hopkins University, and the other in Military Studies.

Berger's formal military education includes the United States Army Infantry Officer Advanced Course, United States Marine Corps Command and Staff College, and United States Marine Corps School of Advanced Warfighting. He is a graduate of the United States Army Ranger School, United States Army Jumpmaster School, United States Navy Dive School, and United States Marine Corps Amphibious Reconnaissance School.

Marine career

Berger was commissioned as an infantry officer in 1981 via NROTC following graduation from Tulane University with a degree in engineering. As a lieutenant and captain, he served as rifle platoon commander in India Company, 3rd Battalion, 7th Marines, 1st Marine Division and later as a company commander and battalion operations officer in 2nd Reconnaissance Battalion during Operation Desert Storm. He also served as officer selection officer in Roanoke, Virginia.

As a field grade officer, Berger was an instructor at  Marine Aviation Weapons and Tactics Squadron One (MAWTS-1) in Yuma, Arizona; instructor at III Marine Expeditionary Force (MEF) Special Operations Training Group; and served on the Joint Staff as a policy planner in the Strategic Plans and Policy Directorate, J-5.

Berger commanded 3rd Battalion, 8th Marines from 2002 to 2004, deploying the battalion first to Okinawa, and later to Haiti in support of Operation Secure Tomorrow. As a colonel, Berger commanded Regimental Combat Team 8 in Fallujah, Iraq, during Operation Iraqi Freedom.

While serving as assistant division commander of 2nd Marine Division, Berger was appointed to the rank of brigadier general. He then deployed to Kosovo, where he served for one year as chief of staff for Kosovo Force (KFOR) Headquarters in Pristina. From 2009 to 2011 he served at Headquarters Marine Corps as the director of operations in plans, policies, and operations. In 2012 he deployed to Afghanistan as the commanding general of 1st Marine Division (forward) in support of Operation Enduring Freedom.

Berger served as commanding general of Marine Air Ground Task Force Training Command and Marine Corps Air Ground Combat Center from 2013 to 2014. In July 2014, Berger was promoted to the rank of lieutenant general and assumed command of I Marine Expeditionary Force. He subsequently assumed command of United States Marine Corps Forces, Pacific. On August 28, 2018, Berger assumed the billets of Commanding General of Marine Corps Combat Development Command and Deputy Commandant for Combat Development and Integration.

On March 26, 2019, he was nominated by President Donald Trump to succeed General Robert B. Neller and become the 38th Commandant of the United States Marine Corps. He was confirmed by the United States Senate on June 5, and took command in a ceremony held July 11 at the Marine Barracks in Washington D.C.

On July 17, 2019, Berger issued his guidance for the Marine Corps: 
"The Commandant’s Planning Guidance (CPG) provides the 38th Commandant’s strategic direction for the Marine Corps and mirrors the function of the Secretary of Defense’s Defense Planning Guidance (DPG). It serves as the authoritative document for Service-level planning and provides a common direction to the Marine Corps Total Force." Highlights include refocusing the Marine Corps on high-end combat, shifting away from legacy platforms like tanks and artillery in favor of long-range missiles and drones.

In February 2022, Berger was the keynote speaker for the 67th MSC Student Conference on National Affairs at Texas A&M University.

Awards and decorations

References

External links

|-

|-

|-

|-

|-

1959 births
Johns Hopkins University alumni
Living people
Recipients of the Defense Superior Service Medal
Recipients of the Legion of Merit
Tulane University alumni
United States Marine Corps Commandants
United States Marine Corps generals
United States Marine Corps personnel of the Iraq War
United States Marine Corps personnel of the War in Afghanistan (2001–2021)